Thomas, Tom or Tommy Griffiths may refer to:

 Thomas Griffiths Wainewright (1794–1847), English journalist and subject-painter
 Thomas Griffiths (bishop) (1791–1847), English Roman Catholic bishop
 Thomas Griffiths (general) (1865–1947), Australian Army colonel and temporary Brigadier General in World War I
 Thomas Griffiths (politician) (1867–1955), Welsh Labour Member of Parliament for Pontypool
 Tom Griffiths (footballer, born 1888) (1888–?), English footballer
 Tommy Griffiths (footballer, born 1901) (1901–1950), English footballer
 Thomas Griffiths (footballer, born 1906) (1906–1981), Welsh footballer
 Thomas Vernon Griffiths (1894–1985), New Zealand music teacher and lecturer, composer
 Thomas Griffiths (priest) (born 1897), Welsh Anglican priest
 Tom Griffiths (rugby union) (born 1995), English rugby union player
 Tommy Griffiths (radio personality), former host of Rumble in the Morning radio program
 T. Ras Makonnen (died 1983), Guyanese-born activist, whose birth name was Thomas Griffiths
 Tom Griffiths (cognitive scientist), professor who heads Princeton's Computational Cognitive Science lab

See also
 Thomas Griffith (disambiguation)